CHBO-FM is a Canadian radio station broadcasting at 107.5 FM in Humboldt, Saskatchewan, with a hot adult contemporary format branded as 107.5 Bolt FM. The station is owned by Golden West Broadcasting.

History
The station received CRTC approval on January 25, 2011, and was officially launched on October 12, 2011.

On April 6, 2018, CHBO's Humboldt Broncos broadcaster Tyler Bieber was one of sixteen who died in a team bus crash near Armley.

References

External links
107.5 Bolt FM
 
 

HBO
HBO
HBO
Humboldt, Saskatchewan
Radio stations established in 2011
2011 establishments in Saskatchewan